The year 2005 in architecture involved some significant architectural events and new buildings.

Events
May 17 – The renovation and restoration of Mies van der Rohe's Crown Hall at the Illinois Institute of Technology commences with the smashing of the first of the large glass walls, a privilege auctioned on eBay for over $2,500.
May 20 – The United States Postal Service honors twelve "Masterworks of Modern Architecture" on first class postage stamps.
October 6–10 – Demolition of the last of the Xanadu Houses.

Buildings and structures

Buildings opened

January 15 – Copenhagen Opera House, Denmark, designed by Henning Larsen.
March 5 – The Kunstmuseum Stuttgart, Germany, designed by Hascher et Jehle.
April 6 – New facility for the Milan Trade Fair in Milan, Italy, designed by Massimiliano Fuksas.
April 14 – Casa da Música, Porto, Portugal, designed by Rem Koolhaas's OMA.
April 17 – Expansion of the Walker Art Center in Minneapolis, Minnesota, designed by Herzog & de Meuron.
April 28 – The Wynn Las Vegas, designed by Jon Jerde.
May 10 – Memorial to the Murdered Jews of Europe in Berlin, designed by Peter Eisenman.
May 11 – Southeast Asian Ceramics Museum at Bangkok University, Thailand, designed by Architects 49.
May 30 – Allianz Arena in  Munich, Germany, designed by Herzog & de Meuron. 
June – Zentrum Paul Klee, Bern, Switzerland, designed by Renzo Piano.
August 27 – The Turning Torso in Malmö, designed by Santiago Calatrava, the tallest building in Sweden and Scandinavia (2005–present).
September – Idea Store Whitechapel, London, UK designed by David Adjaye Associates.
October 8 –Palau de les Arts Reina Sofía, Valencia, designed by Santiago Calatrava.
October 15 – New de Young Museum in San Francisco, California, USA, designed by Herzog & de Meuron.
October 17–18 – National Waterfront Museum, Swansea, UK, designed by Wilkinson Eyre.
October 30 – The reconstructed Dresden Frauenkirche, in Dresden, Germany, is consecrated.
specific date not listed
Bloomberg Tower in Manhattan, New York, United States is completed.
2 Marsham Street in London, designed by Terry Farrell, is first occupied by the British government department, the Home Office, for whom it was built.
Maggie's Centre at Inverness in the Scottish Highlands, a drop-in cancer care centre designed by Page\Park Architects.

Buildings completed

date unknown
The Chongqing World Trade Center in Chongqing, China.
Chelsea Tower in Dubai, United Arab Emirates.
Q1 Tower in Surfers Paradise, Queensland, the tallest building in Australia (2005–present).
Mirador apartment building in Madrid, Spain, designed by MVRDV and Blanca Lleó.
Tromsø Library and City Archives in Norway, designed by Kjell Beite.
Jaume Fuster Library in Barcelona, Spain, designed by Josep Llinás.
Santa Caterina Market roof in Barcelona, designed by Enric Miralles Benedetta Tagliabue.
Antvorskov Church, Slagelse, Denmark, designed by Regnbuen Arkitekter.
St. Henry's Chapel, Turku, Finland, designed by Matti Sanaksenaho.
Private residences
Casa Poli, Concepción, Chile, designed by Pezo von Ellrichshausen.
Casa Tóló, Lugar das Carvalhinhas, Portugal, designed by Álvaro Siza Vieira.
Haus Bold, Bad Waldsee, Germany, designed by Thomas Bendel.
Light House, Notting Hill, London, designed by Gianni Botsford.

Awards
AIA Gold Medal – Santiago Calatrava.
Architecture Firm Award – Murphy/Jahn.
AIA Twenty-five Year Award – Yale Center for British Art, New Haven, Connecticut by Louis Kahn.
 Driehaus Architecture Prize – Quinlan Terry
Emporis Skyscraper Award – Turning Torso by Santiago Calatrava.
European Union Prize for Contemporary Architecture (Mies van der Rohe Prize) – Rem Koolhaas for Netherlands Embassy Berlin
Grand Prix de l'urbanisme – Bernard Reichen.
 LEAF Award, Grand Prix – Henning Larsen Architects for the IT University of Copenhagen
Mies van der Rohe Prize – Rem Koolhaas for the Dutch Embassy (Berlin)
Praemium Imperiale Architecture Award – Yoshio Taniguchi
Pritzker Prize – Thom Mayne, of Morphosis.
Prix de l'Équerre d'Argent – Florence Lipsky and Pascal Rollet for the Science Library at Orléans-la-Source.
RAIA Gold Medal – James Birrell.
RIAS Award for Architecture – Scottish Parliament building, Edinburgh, designed by EMBT/RMJM.
RIBA Royal Gold Medal – Frei Otto.
Stirling Prize – Scottish Parliament building, Edinburgh, designed by EMBT/RMJM.
Thomas Jefferson Medal in Architecture – Shigeru Ban.
Vincent Scully Prize – The Prince of Wales (now Charles III).
Twenty-five Year Award – Yale Center for British Art
UIA Gold Medal – Tadao Ando.

Deaths
January 6 – A. Hays Town, prominent American residential architect based in Baton Rouge, Louisiana (born 1903)
January 23 – Richard Feilden OBE, leading UK architect based in Bath (born 1950)
January 25 – Philip Johnson, influential American architect, first Pritzker Prize honoree (born 1906)
March 16 – Ralph Erskine, British architect, designer of the Byker Wall (born 1914)
March 22 – Kenzo Tange, leading Japanese architect, winner of the 1987 Pritzker Prize (born 1913)
June 4 – Giancarlo De Carlo, Italian architect (born 1919
June 30 – Robert Y. Fleming, American architect (born 1925)
December 15 – James Ingo Freed, American architect (born 1930)

See also
 Architecture Timeline

References

 
21st-century architecture